David Frigerio is an American screenwriter and producer. He is the writer/producer of the 2023 film Land of Bad directed by William Eubank starring Academy Award winner Russell Crowe The cast also stars Liam Hemsworth Luke Hemsworth Milo Ventimiglia Ricky Whittle Daniel MacPherson Chika Ikogwe 

He is the producer of the 2023 film Muzzle directed by John Stalberg Jr. starring Aaron Eckhart and Stephen Lang. 

He is the producer of the 2023 film Bad Hombres directed by John Stalberg Jr. The film stars Tyrese Gibson Thomas Jane Luke Hemsworth Diego Tinoco Nick Cassavetes Hemky Madera Paul Johansson  

He is the producer and co-writer of the 2019 film Crypto, directed by John Stalberg Jr. and released by Lionsgate. His 2014 film The Signal, directed by William Eubank and starring Laurence Fishburne, Brenton Thwaites, and Olivia Cooke, premiered at the 2014 Sundance Film Festival and was released in US theaters on June 13 by Focus Features. In 2010, he wrote and produced Wreckage, directed by John Asher and starring Aaron Paul, Scoot McNairy, and Cameron Richardson.

Background
Frigerio began his writing career as a playwright in New York City, his hometown, writing and producing his first play, an off-Broadway production, at age 21. He is a lover of science fiction and used to attend MUFON conferences, which inspired his work on The Signal. He is strongly influenced by the work of Michio Kaku, Ray Kurzweil, and Neil deGrasse Tyson.

References

External links
 

Living people
Year of birth missing (living people)
American male screenwriters